There are three rivers named the Fitzroy River, all in Australia:

Fitzroy River (Queensland)
Fitzroy River (Victoria)
Fitzroy River (Western Australia)

See also 
 Fitzroy River Barrage (disambiguation)